Len Cella is an American film actor and director. His most recognized works are Moron Movies and More Moron Movies, which are collections of short comedy films ranging in time from five seconds to almost a minute. Among the short films are such titles as "Disguise Class," "The Shy Bra Salesman," "How to Stop a Mugger," and "Bob The Magician."

The films gained popularity and caught the attention of The Tonight Show Starring Johnny Carson. Moron Movies were a regular feature on the show from 1983 to 1985.

After The Tonight Show, Cella's work was shown on Dick Clark's TV's Bloopers & Practical Jokes under the name Len Cella's Silly Cinemas, a moniker that Cella despised.

In 1987 Cella published a book entitled Things to Worry About (In Case You Run Out).

References

External links
 
 
 
 
 
 Len Cella spoof of America's Got Talent
 King Dong – a short film about Len Cella

Living people
1937 births
American film directors
American film producers
American male film actors
American screenwriters
20th-century American writers
20th-century American male writers